This is a list of Norwegian photographers

Rolf Aamot (1934–)
Jonas Bendiksen (1977-)
Knut Bry (1946–)
Catherine Cameron (1962–)
Mimi Frellsen (1830–1914)
Kåre Kivijärvi (1938–1991)
Luca Kleve-Ruud (1978–)
Knud Knudsen (1832–1915)
Elisabeth Meyer (1899–1968)
Gunnar Høst Sjøwall (1936–2013)
Rasmus Pedersen Thu (1864–1946)
Anders Beer Wilse (1865–1949)
Severin Worm-Petersen (1857–1933)

See also
Photography in Norway

Norwegian

Photographers